This is a list of Kansas county courthouses.  Each of Kansas's 105 counties has a courthouse in a city that is the county seat where the county government resides.

See also
List of United States federal courthouses in Kansas

Courthouses, county
Kansas